Wait But Why (WBW) is a website founded by Tim Urban and Andrew Finn and written and illustrated by Urban. The site covers a range of subjects as a long-form blog. Typical posts involve long-form discussions of various topics, including artificial intelligence, outer space, and procrastination, using a combination of prose and rough illustrations.

On May 21, 2014, Urban posted "The Fermi Paradox", a post that became extremely popular. A 2016 Ted Talk by Urban on procrastination, based on concepts from the blog, had garnered over 66 million views by March 2023. A post on the blog about Elon Musk and Neuralink was produced with involvement from Musk himself.

In 2019, Marie Boran of The Irish Times summarized the website as a collection of "lengthy, thoughtful and well-written blog posts", praising them for being an "accessible and entertaining primer on human nature".

In 2023, Urban published What's Our Problem?: A Self-Help Book for Societies, which proposes that our minds have two distinct modes: a high mind that seeks truth and a low mind that seeks confirmation of sacred beliefs. The high mind operates like a scientist in an "idea lab," valuing open-mindedness, avoiding bias and attachment to ideas, and systematically collecting and comparing data and hypotheses. Urban argues that cultivating our high mind is crucial for solving the complex problems we face in today's world.

References

External links 
 
 Official French translation

American blogs
Internet properties established in 2013
2013 establishments in the United States